The 2003 Women's NORCECA Volleyball Championship was the 18th edition of the Women's Continental Volleyball Tournament, played by eight countries from September 13 to September 18, 2003 in Santo Domingo, Dominican Republic. The United States won the championship by defeating Cuba 3-0, and both teams qualified to the 2003 FIVB World Cup. The Dominican Republic won the bronze medal.

Competing nations

Squads

Preliminary round

Group A

September 13

September 14

September 15

Group B

September 13

September 14

September 15

Final round

Quarter-finals
September 16

Semi-finals
September 17

Finals
September 17 — Fifth Place Match

September 18 — Bronze Medal Match

September 18 — Gold Medal Match

Final ranking

The United States and Cuba qualified for the 2003 FIVB Women's World Cup

Individual awards

Most Valuable Player

Best Spiker

Best Blocker

Best Server

Best Digger

Best Setter

Best Receiver

Best Libero

Best Coach

References

External links
 Results

Women's NORCECA Volleyball Championship
N
N
Volleyball